Aazaar Abdul-Rahim (born November 1, 1976) is an American football coach and former player. He is currently the defensive backs coach at Boston College. He served as the head football coach at Friendship Collegiate Academy Public Charter School in his native Washington, D.C. from 2003 to 2013.

Playing career
Abdul-Rahim played defensive back for Mesa Community College from 1995 through 1996, before transferring to San Diego State. He played for the Aztecs from 1997 through 1999. Following his college career, he competed for the San Diego Riptide.

Coaching career

Friendship Collegiate Academy
Following his playing career, Abdul-Rahim founded the football program at Friendship Collegiate Academy in Washington, D.C. in 2003. The school had only been open since 2000. The Knights started play in the 2004 season. After a winless inaugural season, Abdul-Rahim turned FCA into a national powerhouse, routinely playing top ranked teams from the area. In 2012, Abdul-Rahim led the Knight to a District of Columbia State Athletic Association championship. During his tenure, he won 62 games, and produced over 100 Division I football players.

Alabama
Abdul-Rahim joined the Alabama football staff as a defensive analyst for the 2014 season. The next season, he was promoted to assistant director of player personnel.

Maryland
In 2016, Abdul-Rahim joined new head coach D. J. Durkin's staff at Maryland as the defensive backs coach. He was also a huge part of the recruiting efforts, particularly for his ties to the D.C. area. Abdul-Rahim was named a top 25 recruiter by both Rivals.com and 247sports in 2017. In 2018, he shifted his focus from the entire secondary, to primarily working with the cornerbacks.

UMass
In 2019, new head coach Walt Bell hired Abdul-Rahim as the new defensive coordinator and cornerbacks coach at UMass.

Boston College
In 2020, new head coach Jeff Hafley hired Abdul-Rahim as the new defensive backs coach at Boston College Eagles football. Prior to the 2021 season, Abdul-Rahim was promoted to associate head coach and defensive pass game coordinator.

Personal life

Abdul-Rahim also founded “Cover One”, a defensive back training academy that has worked with dozens of NFL players.

References

1976 births
Living people
American football defensive backs
Alabama Crimson Tide football coaches
Boston College Eagles football coaches
Maryland Terrapins football coaches
Mesa Thunderbirds football players
San Diego Riptide players
San Diego State Aztecs football players
UMass Minutemen football coaches
High school football coaches in Washington, D.C.
Junior college football players in the United States
Players of American football from Washington, D.C.